Euxoa simulata is a moth of the family Noctuidae. It is found from British Columbia down to California.

References

Euxoa
Moths of North America
Moths described in 1946